The 2021–22 Michigan Wolverines men's hockey team was the Wolverines' 100th season of play. They represented the University of Michigan in the 2021–22 NCAA Division I men's ice hockey season. They were coached by Mel Pearson, in his fifth year, and played their home games at Yost Ice Arena. The Wolverines won the 2022 Big Ten men's ice hockey tournament and received an automatic bid to the 2022 NCAA Tournament, where they reached their NCAA record 26th Frozen Four and were eliminated in the semifinals by eventual national champion Denver.

Previous season
During the 2020–21 season, Michigan went 15–10–1, including 11–9–0 in Big Ten play. They received an at-large bid to the 2021 NCAA Division I men's ice hockey tournament, however, they were removed from the tournament due to positive COVID-19 test results within the program.

Departures

Recruiting

Roster
As of August 30, 2021.

Coaching staff

Standings

Schedule and results

|-
!colspan=12 style=";" | Exhibition

|-
!colspan=12 style=";" | Regular season

|-
!colspan=12 ! style=""; | 

|-
!colspan=12 style=";" | Regular season

|-
!colspan=12 style=";" | 

|- style="background:#bbbbbb"
| December 30
| 7:00 PM
| #4 Western Michigan*
| align=center|#3
| Yost Ice Arena • Ann Arbor, MI (Great Lakes Invitational)
| colspan=5 rowspan=1 style="text-align:center"|Cancelled due to the COVID-19 pandemic
|-
!colspan=12 style=";" | Regular season

|-
!colspan=12 style=";" | 

|-
!colspan=12 style=";" | 

|-

Rankings

^USCHO.com did not release a Week 24 poll.

Awards and honors

Players drafted into the NHL
Michigan had four players selected in the 2020 NHL Entry Draft. Brendan Brisson was drafted in the first-round, becoming the 25th first-round NHL Draft selection for Michigan, which leads all NCAA teams. Michigan had five players drafted in the 2021 NHL Entry Draft. Owen Power became the first Wolverine to be drafted first overall. Michigan's 2021–22 roster had an NCAA record seven first round draft picks.

References

External links
 Official Website

Michigan Wolverines men's ice hockey seasons
Michigan
Michigan
Michigan ice hockey
Michigan ice hockey
Michigan